Godetia may refer to one of several wildflowers native to the western United States:
 Clarkia amoena
 Clarkia bottae

Warships

Other uses 
Godetia (horse), Irish-trained thoroughbred racehorse active 1978-1980